"Vo ime na ljubovta" ("In the name of love") is a song by Tamara Todevska, Vrčak and Adrian Gaxha, who competed with it at Skopje Fest 2008. The song won, having been awarded the most televotes by the general public and the 7-member expert jury, and an English-language version ("Let Me Love You") represented  at the 2008 Eurovision Song Contest in Belgrade, Serbia, on 22 May 2008.

It was voted the 10th qualifier by the televote, however the juries chose  to pass.

The song was also released in Russian (titled "", Vo Imya Lyubvi), Serbian (titled "" / "Tebe volim"), Turkish (titled "Yoksun") and Albanian (titled "Dashuri mistike"). All versions of the song have alternate music videos. At the Contest, the three of them performed the song with choreographed dancing being displayed behind them. The choreography was arranged by Adrian, who was assisted by a famous German choreographer.

Background
The song was composed and written by Vrčak, who has had previous Eurovision Song Contest experience, having written the lyrics of the Macedonian entry in the 2006 Eurovision Song Contest, "Ninanajna". Tamara, too, has previous Eurovision experience, having contributed backing vocals to the Toše Proeski song, "Life", at the 2004 Eurovision Song Contest. She also placed second at the 2007 Skopje Fest with the song, "Kaži koj si ti", losing to Karolina Gočeva, who went on to represent Republic of North Macedonia at the Eurovision Song Contest 2007. Adrian Gaxha was a runner-up in the 2006 Macedonian Eurovision qualifier, having performed the song "Ljubov E" with Esma Redžepova. Vrčak, Tamara and Adrian have also taken some promotional photos of their Macedonian entry for the Eurovision Song Contest.

Lyrics
"Vo ime na ljubovta" is an R&B-style song with several hip hop verses. Tamara sings about the person she loves, explaining that "without you every second is killing me slowly". She sings that "I don't know where you are [and] I'm waiting for you to come and save me". The song did not sound as it was supposed to in the Skopje Fest 2008 final as the sound of the backing track was not heard in the hall, as well in the TV broadcast. Apparently, the organisers of Skopje Fest, along with MKTV, explained that there were some technical difficulties. Regardless, the song went on to win the contest.

Music video

Six music videos have been released for each version of the song. Though quite similar, the music videos feature the artists singing in the respective language. Director of the videos was Dejan Milicevic. Location where the videos were filmed is the first private university in Republic of Macedonia FON in Skopje. There are daily and nightly scenes in the university's outdoor and indoor. The video features a lot of young people that are dancing around the artists. In one of the scenes Vrčak & Adrian are on motorbike with beautiful girls behind them. In the end of the video Tamara, Vrčak & Adrian are leaving the university dressed in student uniforms.

Track listings
"Vo ime na ljubovta" (Macedonian version)
"Let Me Love You" (English version)
"Yoksun" (Turkish version)
"Tebe volim" (Serbian version)
"Vo Imya Lyubvi" (Russian version)
"Dashuri mistike" (Albanian version)
"Vo ime na ljubovta" (karaoke)
"Let Me Love You" (karaoke)

References

External links
"Vo Ime Na Ljubovta" performed at the 2008 Skopje Fest

Eurovision songs of North Macedonia
Eurovision songs of 2008
2008 songs